The Storm is the third studio album by Irish folk-rock group Moving Hearts, recorded as an entirely instrumental album. When the band re-formed in 2007, they concentrated on performing this material.

Track listing
 The Lark:
 "The Lark in the Morning" (Trad. Arr. Spillane, Lunny, O'Neill)
 "Earl the Breakfast Boiler" (Arr. Lunny, O'Neill)
 "O'Brion's Flightcase" (Arr. Lunny, O'Neill)
 "In the Mountains of Holland" (Arr. Lunny, O'Neill)
 "Oh Hag You've Killed Me" (Arr. Lunny, O'Neill)
 "Peter O'Byrne's Fancy"
 "Langstrom's Pony"
 The Titanic:
 "An Irishman in Brittany" (O'Neill)
 "A Breton in Paris" (Lunny)
 The Storm:
 "The Storm in the Teashirt" (Spillane)
 "The Staff in the Baggot" (Lunny)
 "Finore" (Spillane)
 "Tribute To Peadar O'Donnell" (Lunny)
 "May Morning Dew" (Trad. Arr. Spillane, Lunny, O'Neill)

Personnel
Dónal Lunny - bouzouki, synthesiser & bodhran
Keith Donald - soprano and alto saxophones & bass clarinet
Davy Spillane - uilleann pipes & low whistle
Declan Masterson - uilleann pipes
Greg Boland - guitar
Eoghan O'Neill - bass
Noel Eccles - percussion
Matt Kelleghan - drums

References

External links
 Official website.
Record Label Catalogue 2009
Album Sleevenotes

1985 albums
Moving Hearts albums